İsmail Hakkı Uzunçarşılı (23 August 1888 – 10 October 1977) was a Turkish politician, educator and historian, who was a member of parliament and the Turkish Historical Association.

References 

1888 births
1977 deaths
Writers from Istanbul
20th-century Turkish politicians
20th-century Turkish historians
Turkish educators